Samarlakota  is a town in Kakinada district of the Indian state of Andhra Pradesh. The town forms a part of Godavari Urban Development Authority. It was previously known as Chamarlakota, which dates back to a local kaifiyat that was written in the mid-eighteenth century.

Geography 
It has an average elevation of

Transport 

The Andhra Pradesh State Road Transport Corporation operates bus services from Samarlakota bus station. Samarlakota railway station is an important railway junction on the Visakhapatnam-Vijayawada section of Howrah-Chennai main line. The railway line to Kakinada branches at this railway junction.

Demographics 

Samarlakota is a municipal town in the district of East Godavari, Andhra Pradesh. Samarlakota is divided into 18 wards, for which elections are held every five years. Samarlakota Municipality has a population of 56,864, of which 28,115 are males and 28,749 are females, according to a report released by Census India 2011.

The population of children aged six or younger is 5,793, which is 10.19% of total population of Samarlakota. In Samarlakota Municipality, the male:female sex ratio is 1,023 per 1,000 males, against state average of 993. The child sex ratio in Samarlakota is around 948 compared to the Andhra Pradesh state average of 939. The literacy rate of Samarlakota is 74.58%, higher than state average of 67.02%. Male literacy is around 78.77% while female literacy rate is 70.51%.

Governance

Samarlakota municipality has over 16,044 houses to which it supplies basic amenities like water and sewerage. It is authorized to build roads within the municipality limits and impose taxes on properties coming under its jurisdiction.

Economy

Manufacturing industries at an industrial estate include oil, food and spice manufacture; companies are Ammbati Subbanna & Co, AS Brand Oil, Arun Dorakula Food & Spices Company, and ADR brand are situated in Samarlakota.

Religion

Religious organisations are:
Sri Chalukya Kumararaama Sri Bheemeswara
Swami vaari temple, 
Prasanna aanjaneya Swami temple
 Ganapati Temple,
Mehar complex 
Mutyalamma temple
Sai Baba Temple
Station centre
Municipal Centre
Bhimavarampeta
St.Anthony Shrine Catholic church
Centenary Baptist Church, 
Augustana Lutheran church
True Gospel church
Andhra Baptist Churches

Education 
The town's first boarding school was established in 1882, by the Canadian Baptist Mission it was known as C. B. M. Boys' School. Notable among those who were associated includes A. B. Masilamani and his teacher Chetty Bhanumurthy.

Primary and secondary school education is imparted by government, aided and private schools, under the state's School Education Department. The medium of instruction followed by schools are English and Telugu.

References 

Hindu holy cities
Cities and towns in Kakinada district